Snelgrove Ice Cream was a family-owned company in Salt Lake City founded in 1929 by Charles Rich Snelgrove (1887-1976), and later managed by his eldest son C. Laird Snelgrove.  The operation remained family-owned until about 1990.  The name brand is now owned by the Dreyer's company, which owned the former Snelgrove ice cream factory.

Snelgrove ice cream parlors were located in various locations in the Salt Lake area and in other Utah communities. The largest of these was the flagship store located at 850 East 2100 South, in the Sugar House neighborhood of Salt Lake City, but it was torn down to make way for other developments in March 2021. The decor and architecture of the store was art deco. The factory producing Snelgrove Ice Cream is located directly behind this store. The next oldest location was the Snelgrove store on East South Temple in downtown Salt Lake City. 

Because Snelgrove ice cream was a sentimental favorite in Utah, Dreyer's continued to make and distribute Snelgrove brand ice cream, using some of the original Snelgrove flavors like Canadian Vanilla and Burnt Almond Fudge.  Snelgrove Ice Cream was sold in Utah, New Mexico, Idaho, Montana, and Colorado.  On February 19, 2008, Dreyer ice cream announced it would no longer make the Snelgrove brand.

References

Ice cream brands
Food and drink companies based in Utah
Defunct companies based in Utah
Art Deco architecture in Utah
1929 establishments in Utah